Arturo Navarro García (born 14 March 1989) is a Spanish footballer who plays for Atlético Saguntino as a central defender.

Club career
Born in Castellón de la Plana, Valencian Community, Arturo graduated with Valencia CF's youth setup, and made his senior debuts with the reserves in the 2007–08 campaign, in Tercera División. On 12 November 2008 he made his first team debut, starting in a 3–0 Copa del Rey home win against Club Portugalete.

In the 2010 summer Arturo left the Che, and signed for Ontinyent CF in Segunda División B. In July of the following year he moved to another reserve team, CA Osasuna B in the same division.

On 1 September 2012 Arturo joined CD Guijuelo, also in the third tier. On 16 August of the following year he moved abroad for the first time in his career, signing for Indian I-League side Sporting Clube de Goa.

Arturo made his professional debut for the side on 21 September 2013, playing the full 90 minutes in a 1–1 home draw against Mumbai FC. In January of the following year, after suffering a knee injury, he was released.

On 7 January 2015 Arturo returned to Spain and its third division, after agreeing to a deal with Arroyo CP. On 23 July he moved to fellow league team Arandina CF.

Career statistics

References

External links

CiberChe stats and bio 

1989 births
Living people
Sportspeople from Castellón de la Plana
Spanish footballers
Footballers from the Valencian Community
Association football defenders
Segunda División B players
Tercera División players
Valencia CF Mestalla footballers
Valencia CF players
Ontinyent CF players
CA Osasuna B players
CD Guijuelo footballers
Arandina CF players
CD Castellón footballers
I-League players
Sporting Clube de Goa players
Spanish expatriate footballers
Expatriate footballers in India
Spanish expatriate sportspeople in India
Atlético Saguntino players